Nikita Gennadyevich Chicherin (born 18 August 1990) is a Russian professional footballer who plays as a right-back, most recently for Tajikistan Higher League club FC Istiklol.

Career
In March 2015, Chicherin signed for FC Sakhalin Yuzhno-Sakhalinsk.

On 31 March 2022, Istiklol confirmed the signing of Chicherin. On 6 July 2022, Istiklol announced that Chicherin had left the club after his contract had expired.

Career statistics

Club

Honors
Istiklol
 Tajik Supercup (1): 2022

External links
 Player page on the official FC Dynamo Moscow site

References

1990 births
Living people
Footballers from Moscow
Russian footballers
Association football fullbacks
Russia youth international footballers
Russia under-21 international footballers
FC Dynamo Moscow players
FC Khimki players
FC Sibir Novosibirsk players
FC Volga Nizhny Novgorod players
FC Tom Tomsk players
FC Mika players
FC Sakhalin Yuzhno-Sakhalinsk players
FC Yenisey Krasnoyarsk players
PFC Krylia Sovetov Samara players
FC Tambov players
FC Neftekhimik Nizhnekamsk players
FC Akron Tolyatti players
FC Istiklol players
Russian Premier League players
Russian First League players
Armenian Premier League players
Russian expatriate footballers
Expatriate footballers in Armenia
Russian expatriate sportspeople in Armenia
Expatriate footballers in Tajikistan
Russian expatriate sportspeople in Tajikistan